Eugenes is usually considered a monotypic genus with its sole member the magnificent hummingbird (E. fulgens).

Species
The genus contains two species:

References

External links

 
Bird genera